Stafford Henry Northcote, 1st Earl of Iddesleigh  (27 October 1818 – 12 January 1887), known as Sir Stafford Northcote, Bt from 1851 to 1885, was a British Conservative politician. He served as Chancellor of the Exchequer between 1874 and 1880 and as Foreign Secretary between 1885 and 1886

According to Nigel Keohane, historians have portrayed him "as a man who fell short of the ultimate achievement of being prime minister largely because of personal weakness, and lack of political virility and drive."

Background and education
Northcote (pronounced "Northcut") was born at Portland Place, London, on 27 October 1818. He was the eldest son of Henry Stafford Northcote (1792–1850), eldest son of Sir Stafford Henry Northcote, 7th Baronet. His mother was Agnes Mary (died 1840), daughter of Thomas Cockburn. His paternal ancestors had long been settled in Devon, tracing their descent from Galfridas de Nordcote who settled there in 1103. The family home was situated at Pynes House northwest of Exeter. Northcote was educated at Eton and Balliol College, Oxford and was called to the bar, Inner Temple, in 1847.

Early political career
In 1843 Northcote became private secretary to William Ewart Gladstone at the Board of Trade. Northcote was afterwards legal secretary to the board and, after acting as one of the secretaries to the Great Exhibition of 1851, co-operated with Sir Charles Trevelyan in framing the Northcote–Trevelyan Report, which revolutionized the conditions of appointment to the Civil Service. He succeeded his grandfather, Sir Stafford Henry Northcote (1762–1851), as 8th baronet in 1851. He entered Parliament in 1855 as Conservative Member of Parliament for Dudley with the support of the influential local landowner Lord Ward. However, tensions between Northcote and Lord Ward soon arose, in particular over a vote over conflict with China in which the two men supported opposite sides in the vote. Northcote subsequently decided not to contest Dudley again and stood unsuccessfully for North Devon in 1857. He returned to Parliament the following year, when he was elected for Stamford in 1858, a seat that he exchanged in 1866 for North Devon. He was briefly Financial Secretary to the Treasury under the Earl of Derby from January to July 1859.

Later political career

Steadily supporting his party, he became President of the Board of Trade in 1866, Secretary of State for India in 1867 and Chancellor of the Exchequer in 1874. In 1870, during the interval between the last two appointments, he was the Governor of the Hudson's Bay Company, North America's oldest company (established by an English royal charter in 1670), when it sold the Northwest Territories to Canada. Northcote was one of the commissioners for the settlement of the Alabama Claims with the United States, culminating with the Treaty of Washington in 1871.

On Benjamin Disraeli's elevation to the House of Lords as Earl of Beaconsfield in 1876, Northcote became Leader of the Conservatives in the Commons. As a finance minister, he largely continued the lines of policy laid down by Gladstone. However, he distinguished himself by his dealings with the debt, especially his introduction of the new sinking fund in 1876 by which he fixed the annual charge for the debt in such a way as to provide for a regular series of payments off the capital.

His temper as leader was, however, too gentle to satisfy the more ardent spirits among his own followers. Party cabals (in which Lord Randolph Churchill took a leading part) led to Northcote's elevation to the Lords in 1885, when Lord Salisbury became prime minister. Taking the titles of Earl of Iddesleigh and Viscount St Cyres, he was included in the cabinet as First Lord of the Treasury. In Lord Salisbury's 1886 ministry he became Foreign Secretary, but the arrangement was not a comfortable one, and his resignation had just been decided upon when on 12 January 1887, he died very suddenly at the First Lord of the Treasury's official residence, 10 Downing Street.

Other public positions

Northcote was elected a Fellow of the Royal Society in 1875 and Lord Rector of Edinburgh University in 1883, in which capacity he addressed the students on the subject of "Desultory Reading". From 1886 to 1887 he was also Lord Lieutenant of Devon. He was not a prolific or notable writer, but amongst his works were Twenty Years of Financial Policy (1862), a valuable study of Gladstonian finance, and Lectures and Essays (1887). His Life by Andrew Lang appeared in 1890. Northcote was appointed a CB in 1851 and a GCB in 1880 and was sworn of the Privy Council in 1866.
He was one of only two people to hold the office of First Lord of the Treasury without ever being Prime Minister.

Family and personal life

Northcote married Cecilia Frances Farrer (died 1910), daughter of Thomas Farrer and sister of Thomas Farrer, 1st Baron Farrer, in 1843. They had seven sons and three daughters. His second son, Henry, 1st Baron Northcote, was Governor-General of Australia. Another son, Amyas, later became known as a writer of ghost stories.

In the aftermath of the British Expedition to Abyssinia, Northcote built up a small but prestigious collection of Ethiopian artefacts that is now in the British Museum.

The 1881 Census shows him living next door to Lord Randolph Churchill MP and family, at 30 St James Place, Westminster.

References

Further reading
 Cooke, A. B. “A Conservative Party Leader in Ulster: Sir Stafford Northcote’s Diary of a Visit to the Province, October 1883.” Proceedings of the Royal Irish Academy. Section C: Archaeology, Celtic Studies, History, Linguistics, Literature,  vol. 75, (1975), pp. 61–84, online.
 Iddesleigh, Stafford Henry Northcote. "Speech of the Rt. Hon. Sir Stafford Northcote, to the Working-Men’s Conservative Association of Edinburgh" (Edinburgh Conservative Association, 1876), pp. 1–12, online

 Keohane, Nigel Thomas. "The Lost Leader: Sir Stafford Northcote and the Leadership of the Conservative Party, 1876–85." Parliamentary History 27.3 (2008): 361-379.
 Lang, Andrew. Life, Letters, and Diaries of Sir Stafford Northcote, First Earl of Iddesleigh (1891) online
 Swartz, Marvin. The politics of British foreign policy in the era of Disraeli and Gladstone (London: Macmillan, 1985).

External links 

 
 The Rowers of Vanity Fair – Northcote, Stafford Henry (Earl of Iddesleigh)

Chancellors of the Exchequer of the United Kingdom
1818 births
1887 deaths
People educated at Eton College
Alumni of Balliol College, Oxford
British Secretaries of State for Foreign Affairs
British Secretaries of State
Leaders of the Conservative Party (UK)
Conservative Party (UK) MPs for English constituencies
UK MPs 1852–1857
UK MPs 1857–1859
UK MPs 1859–1865
UK MPs 1865–1868
UK MPs 1868–1874
UK MPs 1874–1880
UK MPs 1880–1885
UK MPs who were granted peerages
Iddesleigh, Stafford Northcote, 1st Earl of
Iddesleigh, Stafford Northcote, 1st Earl of
Iddesleigh, Stafford Northcote, 1st Earl of
Iddesleigh, Stafford Northcote, 1st Earl of
Rectors of the University of Edinburgh
Governors of the Hudson's Bay Company
Fellows of the Royal Society
Leaders of the House of Commons of the United Kingdom
Presidents of the Board of Trade
Iddesleigh, Stafford Northcote, 1st Earl of